Wilcox is an extinct town in Whitman County, in the U.S. state of Washington. The GNIS classifies it as a populated place.

A post office called Wilcox was established in 1892, and remained in operation until 1935. Robert Wilcox, an early postmaster, gave the community its name.

References

Ghost towns in Washington (state)
Geography of Whitman County, Washington